John C. Holstein (born January 10, 1945) is a former judge of the Supreme Court of Missouri, under an appointment by then-Governor John Ashcroft. From 1995 to 1997, he served as chief justice for the court. In 2002 he retired from the court and returned to private practice in Springfield, Missouri. Judge Holstein received his B.A. in Political Science from Southwest Missouri State University in 1967, and his law degree from the University of Missouri School of Law in 1970.

References

External links
Attorney Profile, Polsinelli Shugart PC

Chief Justices of the Supreme Court of Missouri
Living people
1945 births
Judges of the Supreme Court of Missouri
Missouri State University alumni
University of Missouri School of Law alumni
20th-century American judges
21st-century American judges